Drawn to Life: Two Realms is a puzzle-platform game developed by Digital Continue and published by 505 Games. The game is a sequel to Drawn to Life: The Next Chapter and is the 3rd canon game in the Drawn to Life Series and the 7th Drawn to Life release overall (including Drawn to Life: SpongeBob SquarePants Edition, the Wii version of Drawn to Life: The Next Chapter, Drawn to Life: Collection, and the iOS port of Drawn to Life). The game was released on December 7, 2020.

Gameplay 
Drawn to Life: Two Realms is a 2D puzzle-platform game where the player draws their own hero to play as, similar to previous incarnations. Unlike previous games in the series, Drawn to Life: Two Realms uses isometric graphics for the villages outside of levels, and allows the player to explore the never-before-seen Human world.

New to the game is the addition of "toys" which can be placed directly into the level to help The Hero progress. This is analogous to the Action Drawing mechanic seen in Drawn to Life: The Next Chapter (Nintendo DS video game) and Drawn to Life: The Next Chapter (Wii video game).

Village Mode 
Unlike previous Drawn to Life games, Drawn to Life: Two Realms adopts a pixel-inspired isometric view of the village areas outside of levels. The village areas in both the Human and Raposa realms act as a general hub where the player can interact with the characters and progress the game.

Draw Mode 
A new Creation Tool introduced in Drawn to Life: Two Realms expands the creative possibility with millions of colors, unique stickers, templates, and new hero animations. The player can unlock additional Stickers to further customize and save different looks for their Hero via the new “Outfit System”.

In Drawn to Life: Two Realms, Draw Mode takes a major overhaul. Like previous Drawn to Life installments, stamps, templates, and basic drawing tools are available (such as the fill bucket, eraser, and varying brush sizes). However, new tools exist such as transparency locking (Alpha Lock) and a digital color-picker.

A basic color palette exists which allows the player to choose basic colors for their creations. The colors available on this basic palette are nearly identical to those available on the standard palette of Drawn to Life's Draw Mode, with the exclusion of one color.

Plot
The game begins with Mari praying to the Creator and reminiscing on the events of the past two games, when a hooded Raposa (Who is implied to be Wilfre) appears behind her. He gives her the Book of Imagination and tells her how different the human realm is from the Raposa realm. Mari thanks him for his help and goes to Creation Hall.

Inside Creation Hall, Mari prays to the Creator again and asks for a new Hero. After sending her a Hero, she asks how the Hero will fit in, in the human realm. The Creator tells Mari the humans will see the Hero as one of them.

Development
Many of the original creators of the first two DS games make a return in Drawn to Life: Two Realms, including artists Chern Fai and Edison Yan, executive producer Joseph Tringali, and composer David J. Franco.

Reception

The game received "mixed or average reviews" according to video game review aggregator Metacritic.  Nintendo Life called it "a sequel that fails to replicate what made the Drawn To Life games so compelling" criticizing the games gameplay mechanics and plot.

Future
In a 2020 interview, Digital Continue founder Joseph Tringali stated that remakes of the previous games as well a "larger and expansive sequel" were things that the developer had been interested in developing. Yet, confirmed that any future plans for the series depends on the sales and reception of Drawn to Life: Two Realms.

References

2020 video games
Android (operating system) games
Drawing video games
IOS games
Nintendo Switch games
505 Games games
Puzzle-platform games
Video games developed in the United States
Video game sequels